Grisha Ivanov (born 16 January 1985) is a football striker from the Bulgaria currently playing for Brestnik 1948. He was raised in Botev Plovdiv's youth teams.

External links 
  Kaliakra Kavarna profile

Bulgarian footballers
1985 births
Living people
Footballers from Plovdiv
Association football forwards
Botev Plovdiv players
PFC Kaliakra Kavarna players
First Professional Football League (Bulgaria) players